(formerly Ewa Müller; born 16 July 1984), known under her stage name Schwesta Ewa, is a Polish rapper in the German music scene. 

Ewa's family was stranded in Germany while en route to the United States when she was a child. She rose to fame in Frankfurt, where she originally moved in order to work as a prostitute. While working, she met the rapper Xatar, who signed her to his record label, and her first album, reached number 11 on the German album chart. 

In November 2016, Ewa was arrested and later convicted of bodily harm, abuse of minors and tax violations in connection with the prostitution of five of her fans, some of whom were underage. She was released in February 2021.

Early life 

 was born 16 July 1984 in Koszalin, Poland to a Polish-Jewish and Moslem family. Her father was arrested and imprisoned on the charge of murder while Ewa's mother was pregnant, and so  spent the first three years of her life in hiding – her mother feared that the family of the victim would attack her in revenge.

When  was 3 years old, her mother left Poland and headed for West Berlin, with the aim of seeking asylum in the United States. Her mother was approved for a Green Card but was then convicted of theft. The Green Card was withdrawn, leaving the family stranded in Germany.  grew up in a refugee home, and later a women's shelter, in Kiel, Schleswig-Holstein, at the time in West Germany. Her mother married a German man, and  took her stepfather's surname, Müller.  has two brothers born in Germany, who know that she worked as a prostitute. 's mother does not know about her career, and she is no longer in contact with her father.

 began sex work at the brothel in the back of the bar. She then moved to Bonn, and then on to Frankfurt's  red light district. Her alias there was "", for which she adopted a false Polish accent. There, she was able to earn €20,000–30,000 a month as a prostitute, but also became addicted to crack cocaine. Suffering under its effects, her looks deteriorated and her earnings began to decrease, until she was forced to give up cold turkey.

Career

Her breakthrough came at a party in Bonn, where she met the rapper and record label boss Xatar. Xatar was impressed by her voice and became her friend. He later signed her and became her mentor, sending her to London to practice her rapping.

In December 2009, Xatar and seven accomplices robbed €1.7 million of gold from a transporter lorry. Xatar fled to Iraq, where he was caught and arrested in February 2010. Xatar's flight and subsequent arrest impacted 's career – she found herself "twiddling her thumbs", unable to share her tracks with him. However, she also decided that she would not go back to prostitution – her promotion as a rapper meant that she was now famous, and she was worried about returning to drugs. She has described rap as a form of music therapy, helping her work through her past.

Her first mixtape,  ("Reality") was released on 5 October 2012. No tracks from Realität charted, but her first music video,  ("Small Talker") received over six million views on YouTube. After the release of the  video in 2011, Ewa gave up prostitution to become a full-time artist.

Her debut album,  (from the Polish , both a slang term for "whore" and a general-purpose expletive; formerly  ("Dr. Deflowering", with "Dr" also standing for )) was released in January 2015 and reached number 11 in the German album charts.

Lyrical content
Many of 's songs cover scenes from her life as a prostitute, and she describes herself as a storytelling rapper; topics include being attacked by johns, and being forced to watch the rape of a friend.

 has described herself as uncomfortable on stage and sometimes suffers stage fright. She therefore prefers to rap straight through, without banter or comic routines. However, she is accompanied on tour by strip dancers who perform as she sings.

Bar and arrest 
Alongside her rap career,  opened a bar in Central Frankfurt, . The bar was raided by police on suspicion that it was an illegal brothel, prompting an angry response from Ewa who wrote on Facebook "This is a bar, not a brothel! [...] I will open a legal brothel in two months. It will pay taxes etc. Don't worry!"

Following the arrest, Ewa's record label released a statement that her surname had been changed to Malanda. On 20 June 2017, Malanda was found guilty of 35 counts of bodily harm, tax violations and the abuse of minors, and was sentenced to 2 years and 6 months. She was cleared of pimping and human trafficking, on the grounds that the girls had become prostitutes of their own free will. Malanda's appeals to the Federal Court of Justice (Bundesgerichtshof) were rejected.

In February 2021, Malanda announced via Instagram that she had been released from prison early for good behavior, having served two-thirds of her sentence. She said that her three-year-old daughter, Aaliyah Jeyla Malanda, had suffered trauma due to being away from her mother.

Discography

Studio albums

Mixtapes 
 2012:  (Alles oder Nix Records)

Singles 

 2018: Schubse den Bullen
 2018: Mein Geständnis
 2018: Tabledance (with SXTN)
 2018: Alles nur Show (with Bonez MC)
 2019: Cruella
 2019: Tokat
 2020: Bang Bang
 2020: Mama iz da
 2022: Mehr Eier (with XATAR)

Other releases 

 2021: Break Ups (Krankfurt Remix) [with Senna Gammour, LIZ]

References

External links 

 Official website

1984 births
Musicians from Kiel
People from Koszalin
Musicians from Frankfurt
Polish rappers
Polish emigrants to Germany
Living people
Polish sex workers